The 1985–86 Cypriot First Division was the 47th season of the Cypriot top-level football league. APOEL won their 13th title.

Format
Fourteen teams participated in the 1985–86 Cypriot First Division. All teams played against each other twice, once at their home and once away. The team with the most points at the end of the season crowned champions. No team was relegated to the 1986–87 Cypriot Second Division.

The champions ensured their participation in the 1986–87 European Cup and the runners-up in the 1986–87 UEFA Cup.

Changes from previous season
Omonia Aradippou and Evagoras Paphos were relegated from previous season and played in the 1985–86 Cypriot Second Division. They were replaced by the first two teams of the 1984–85 Cypriot Second Division, Ermis Aradippou and APOP Paphos.

Stadia and locations

League standings

Results

See also
 Cypriot First Division
 1985–86 Cypriot Cup
 List of top goalscorers in Cypriot First Division by season
 Cypriot football clubs in European competitions

References

Sources

 

Cypriot First Division seasons
Cyprus
1985–86 in Cypriot football